Hold On for Dear Life is a studio album by American hip hop artist Onry Ozzborn. It was released on Fake Four Inc. on January 25, 2011.

Music 
The album is produced by Sapient, Bean One, Smoke M2D6, Budo, Nickels, Mr. Hill, P Smoov, Peegee 13, and Zavala. Guest appearances include Sapient, Maggie Morrison of Gayngs, Thaddeus, Tilson and fellow Oldominion members Peegee 13, Candidt, Xperience and IAME.

Track listing

References

External links 
 Hold On For Dear Life at Bandcamp
 Hold On For Dear Life at Discogs

2011 albums
Fake Four Inc. albums
Onry Ozzborn albums